Nathan East is the debut eponymous album by veteran supporting musician Nathan East, known for his performances with artists such as Stevie Wonder, Eric Clapton, Tommy Emmanuel and Daft Punk. This album features guest vocal performances by Clapton, Sara Bareilles, Michael McDonald, and a harmonica performance by Wonder on the instrumental cover of Wonder's hit "Overjoyed". East has also included a second Wonder instrumental cover, a reimagining of the Songs in the Key of Life song "Sir Duke".

As East is best known for his bass guitar skills, the album contains many bass guitar led melodies. The cover of the 1965 Beatles song "Yesterday" features East's son Noah East on piano. While largely an album of covers, including those of East's band Fourplay and Steve Winwood's "Can't Find My Way Home", which East had previous played on tours with Clapton, there are also original works, such as "Daft Funk", a play on words on East's work with French group Daft Punk, and "Madiba", a tribute to former South African president Nelson Mandela.

Track listing

References

2014 debut albums
Albums produced by Nathan East
Jazz albums by American artists